Annals of the Former World is a book on geology written by John McPhee and published in 1998 by Farrar, Straus and Giroux. It won the 1999 Pulitzer Prize for General Nonfiction.

The book presents a geological history of North America, and was researched and written over the course of two decades beginning in 1978. It consists of a compilation of five books, the first four of which were previously published as Basin and Range (1981), In Suspect Terrain (1983), Rising from the Plains (1986), and Assembling California (1993), plus a final book, Crossing the Craton. A narrative table of contents provides an overview of the project, which largely consisted of a series of road journeys by McPhee across the North American continent in the company of noted geologists.

References

External links

Archived copy of Annals of the Former World, formerly on John McPhee's website
New York Times Book Review, July 5, 1998

Pulitzer Prize for General Non-Fiction-winning works
1998 non-fiction books
Books about California
Farrar, Straus and Giroux books
Books by John McPhee